ANAVIP is the trade name of a snake antivenin indicated for the management of adult and pediatric patients with North American rattlesnake envenomation. As defined by the FDA, the proper name is crotalidae immune F(ab')2 (equine).  It is manufactured by Instituto Bioclon for Rare Disease Therapeutics in the United States. 

ANAVIP is a divalent fragment antigen-binding protein, F(ab')2, derived from the blood of horses immunized with the venom of the snakes Bothrops asper and Crotalus durissus. The product is produced by pepsin digestion of horse blood plasma then purified resulting in a preparation containing >85% F(ab')2.

References

Antitoxins
Medical treatments